Dihydroorotase (carbamoylaspartic dehydrase, dihydroorotate hydrolase) is an enzyme which converts carbamoyl aspartic acid into 4,5-dihydroorotic acid in the biosynthesis of pyrimidines. It forms a multifunctional enzyme with carbamoyl phosphate synthetase and aspartate transcarbamoylase. Dihydroorotase is a zinc metalloenzyme.

See also 
 Pyrimidine biosynthesis

References

External links 
 
 

EC 3.5.2